2nd Battalion, 1st Marines (2/1) is an infantry battalion in the United States Marine Corps based out of Camp Horno on Marine Corps Base Camp Pendleton, California. Nicknamed "The Professionals," the battalion consists of approximately 1,200 Marines and Sailors. Normally they fall under the command of the 1st Marine Regiment and the 1st Marine Division.

Subordinate units
 Headquarters and Services Company
 Echo Company
 Fox Company
 Golf Company
 Hotel Company
 Weapons Company (CAAT RED, CAAT BLUE, 81s [Mortars] Platoon, Scout Sniper Platoon)

History
The battalion was activated August 1, 1922, at Santo Domingo, Dominican Republic, as the 2nd Battalion, 1st Regiment and was assigned to the 2nd Brigade. The battalion played a role in the occupation of the Dominican Republic, after which it was deactivated on July 20, 1924.

World War II

The battalion was reactivated March 1, 1941, at Guantanamo Bay, Cuba, as the 2nd Battalion, 1st Marines and was assigned to the 1st Marine Division of the Fleet Marine Force. The force was active for only a brief period of time, during which it was deployed to Marine Corps Recruit Depot Parris Island, South Carolina. The unit was again deactivated on June 14, 1941.

Shortly after the United States entered into World War II, the unit was reactivated February 11, 1942, at New River, North Carolina. It was again assigned to the 1st Marine Division, which deployed in July 1942 to Wellington, New Zealand. The battalion participated in numerous campaigns in the Pacific Theater of WWII, and was a part of the American advance into Japanese territory in the Pacific. The first of these was the Guadalcanal Campaign, during which the battalion defended Henderson Field, an airfield on Guadalcanal, and withstood Japanese bombings of the strategic location. They later participated in Operation Cartwheel, specifically the Battle of Cape Gloucester, during which they withstood several Japanese Banzai charges. Later, during the Battle of Peleliu, the unit suffered heavy casualties during their defense of the Umurbrogal Pocket. In their last engagement in the Pacific, the unit participated in the decisive Battle of Okinawa, taking part in the capture of Shuri during poor weather conditions.

At the close of World War II, in September 1945, the unit was redeployed to Tiensin, China, where they were a part of the occupation of northern China until October 1947, when the unit was deactivated.

Korean War and early 1960s
2nd Battalion was reactivated August 4, 1950, at Camp Lejeune, North Carolina, and again assigned to the 1st Marine Division, Fleet Marine Force. It was almost immediately deployed to Kobe, Japan in preparation for its participation in the Korean War from September 1950 – July 1953, during which it fought at Inchon-Seoul, Chosin Reservoir, the East Central Front, and the Western Front. After the war, the unit aided in the defense of the Korean Demilitarized Zone.

On September 20th, 1950. The 2nd Battalion, 1st Marines set up a L-shaped ambush near Yongdungpo. A North Korean column of hundreds of NKPA troops and five T-34 tanks headed blindly into the ambush set by the Marines. Short-range fire from Marine 3.5-inch bazookas knocked out the first two enemy tanks; a storm of direct and indirect fire cut down the supporting infantry, killing 300 North Korean men. The surviving North Koreans withdrew to their prepared defenses within Yongdungpo.

After the war, in April 1955, the unit was relocated to Camp Pendleton, California, where it participated in the transplacement system between the 1st and 3rd Marine Divisions.

Vietnam War
 Deployed during November 1965 to South Vietnam, and assigned to the 3rd Marine Division, Fleet Marine Force
 Participated in the War in Vietnam, November 1965 – May 1971,
Thừa Thiên Province 
Huế/Phu Bai)
Quảng Nam Province
Da Nang Air Base
Quảng Trị Province
Quảng Tín Province
   Major Operations and Battles
Operation Oregon Quảng Trị Province Mar 20–23, 1966
Operation Hastings/Operation Deckhouse II Quảng Trị Province Jul 7 – August 3, 1966
Thủy Bồ incident Quảng Nam province Jan 31 – Feb 1, 1967, According to Vietnamese communist sources, from 31 January to 1 February 1967, Company H massacred up to 145 Vietnamese civilians, while according to American sources, 101 Vietcong and 22 civilians were killed in two days of fighting with Vietcong insurgents who occupied the village. The Americans suffered 5 dead and 26 wounded.
Operation Union I/Operation Lien Ket 102 Quảng Nam and Quảng Tín Provinces Apr 21 – May 17, 1967 
Operation Medina Quảng Trị Province Oct 11–20, 1967
Operation Kentucky Quảng Trị Province November 1, 1967 – February 28, 1968
Operation Napoleon/Saline Quảng Trị Province Feb 19 – December 9, 1968
Battle of Huế Thừa Thiên Province January 30 – March 3, 1968
Operation Scotland II Quảng Trị Province April 15, 1968 – February 28, 1969
 Detached during April 1971 from the 1st Marine Division, and reassigned to the 3rd Marine Amphibious Brigade, Fleet Marine Force
 Relocated during June 1971 to Camp Pendleton, CA, and reassigned to the 1st Marine Division, Fleet Marine Force

Post War and the 1980s
 Participated during April – May 1975 in Operation New Arrivals, the relocation of refugees from Indochina
 Participated in the Battalion rotation between the 3rd Marine Division on Okinawa and Divisions stationed in the United States during the 1980s
 Deactivated January 24, 1989
 Reactivated September 9, 1994, at Camp Pendleton, CA, and assigned to the 1st Marine Division.

Global War on Terrorism

As part of the 15th Marine Expeditionary Unit, the battalion deployed to Kuwait in February 2003, and participated in the invasion of Iraq in March 2003.
The battalion deployed in March 2004, to Fallujah, Iraq and took part in Operation Vigilant Resolve. They returned to Iraq in 2005 with the 13th Marine Expeditionary Unit and engaged in combat operations during Operation Steel Curtain in Husaybah, Karabilah, and New Ubaydi, and Operation Iron Hammer in Hit. The battalion deployed to Okinawa to serve as the Ground Combat Unit for the 31st Marine Expeditionary Unit from January 1, 2007, until January 1, 2008. The battalion deployed to Iraq in January 2009 and returned in August of the same year.

The battalion deployed to Afghanistan in October 2010 through May 15, 2011, in support of Operation Enduring Freedom. They operated in the Garmsir District, Helmand Province. In June 2012, the battalion returned to Okinawa as the Ground Combat Element for the 31st Marine Expeditionary Unit. In March 2014, 2/1 deployed as the Ground Combat Element of the 11th MEU.  

The battalion lost nine Marines and one Navy Corpsman on August 26th, 2021 in a deadly suicide bomber attack during the withdrawal from Kabul's Hamid Karzai International Airport.  The ISIS-K terror group claimed responsibility for the suicide bombing seeking to disrupt the massive evacuation effort of Americans, Afghan allies and third-party nationals outside the U.S.-held airport.   The attack in total took the lives of 13 American Servicemen and women.

Unit awards

A unit citation or commendation is an award bestowed upon an organization for the action cited. Members of the unit who participated in said actions are allowed to wear on their uniforms the awarded unit citation. 2/1 has been presented with the following awards:

Notable former members
Troy E. Black – 19th Sergeant Major of the Marine Corps
John L. Estrada - 15th Sergeant Major of the Marine Corps; former US Ambassador to Trinidad and Tobago
Raymond Kelly – NYPD Commissioner
Charles C. Krulak – 31st Commandant of the Marine Corps from July 1, 1995, to June 30, 1999
Robert Leckie – author of Helmet for My Pillow
Gen Peter Pace – former Chairman of the Joint Chiefs of Staff
Lewis Burwell Puller, Jr. – son of General Lewis "Chesty" Puller and Pulitzer prize winning author
Douglas Zembiec – The "Lion of Fallujah"

Motto
Get Results

Uphold The Legacy

Never Quit

Spirited Ethos

Mutual Trust

Ownership

Know Your Stuff

Everyday Counts Towards Combat Effectiveness

See also

List of United States Marine Corps battalions
Organization of the United States Marine Corps

External links
2/1 Marines During Operation Hastings
2/1's invasion into Iraq (Umm Qasr and An Nasiriyah) greatly detailed in the book 15 Years of War.

Notes

References

Bibliography

External links
 2/1's official website
 Vietnam Veterans of the 2nd BN 1st Marines

Infantry battalions of the United States Marine Corps
1st Marine Division (United States)